The Illinois School for the Visually Impaired (ISVI), located in Jacksonville, Illinois, is a state-operated pre-kindergarten, elementary and high school for the blind and visually impaired. The school provides educational instruction and other resources for not only its school-aged students but also for persons up to age 21.

Founded in 1849 as the Illinois Institution for the Education of the Blind, the school was known as the Illinois School for the Blind from 1905 to 1954 and the Illinois Braille and Sight Saving School from then until the 1976/77 school year, when it gained its current name.

Campus
The school has a dormitory.

Athletics
ISVI is an active member of the Illinois High School Association and fields teams in sports such as swimming and diving, as well as Track and field for both male and female competitors. The school also offers wrestling for males and competitive cheerleading for females.

Notable alumni
Lennie Tristano, jazz musician

References

Further reading

External links
Official website
Illinois School for the Visually Impaired – Clio

Jacksonville, Illinois
Jacksonville, Illinois micropolitan area
Public K–8 schools in Illinois
Public high schools in Illinois
Schools in Morgan County, Illinois
Schools for the blind in the United States
Educational institutions established in 1849
Public K-12 schools in the United States
Public boarding schools in the United States
Boarding schools in Illinois